Rinteln is a small town in Lower Saxony, Germany. It is located on the banks of the Weser river above the Porta Westfalica. The town of Rinteln is in the broad valley between the hills of the Weserbergland and the North Lippe Bergland. In relation to some well known places, it is 60 kilometers west of Hanover, and just 20 kilometers from Hamelin of Pied Piper fame. Its population is about 28,500.

It is accessed by the A2 autobahn (E30).

History
The settlement of Rinteln was founded about 1150 on the northern bank of the Weser. Later, in 1235, the village of Neu-Rinteln ("New Rinteln") was founded on the southern bank. It is the origin of the modern town, since the northern village was abandoned in 1350 due to the plague. The village grew to a fortified town, that served as a southern stronghold of the Counts of Schaumburg.

From 1621 until its dissolution in 1810 during the Westphalian rule under Jérôme Bonaparte, Rinteln was the seat of Ernestina University. When the County of Schaumburg was divided in 1640, Rinteln became the capital of the eastern part which retained the name Grafschaft Schaumburg hessischen Anteils. The Eulenburg in Rinteln became the seat of the counts. Rinteln remained the capital of the county and later of the district, until it was merged with the neighboring district of Schaumburg-Lippe in 1977.

In 1875, the railway station was opened.

Villages

Ahe
Deckbergen
Engern
Exten
Friedrichshöhe
Friedrichswald
Goldbeck
Hohenrode
Kohlenstädt
Krankenhagen
Möllenbeck
Rinteln
Schaumburg
Steinbergen
Strücken
Todenmann
Uchtdorf
Volksen
Wennenkamp
Westendorf

International relations

Rinteln is twinned with:

  Kendal, Cumbria
  Sławno, Pomerania

References

External links

  

Populated places established in the 12th century
Schaumburg
1150s establishments in Germany